Estradiol propionate (or estradiol propanoate) may refer to:

 Estradiol 17β-propionate
 Estradiol 3-propionate
 Estradiol 3,17β-dipropionate